The men's 100m breaststroke SB5 event at the 2012 Summer Paralympics took place at the London Aquatics Centre on 5 September. There were two heats; the swimmers with the eight fastest times advanced to the final.

Results

Heats
Competed from 10:26.

Heat 1

Heat 2

Final
Competed at 18:23.

 
'Q = qualified for final. AS = Asian Record.  DSQ = Disqualified.

References
Official London 2012 Paralympics Results: Heats 
Official London 2012 Paralympics Results: Final 

Swimming at the 2012 Summer Paralympics